Hødnebø is a Norwegian surname. Notable people with the surname include:

Finn Hødnebø (1919–2007), Norwegian philologist and lexicographer
Tone Hødnebø (born 1962), Norwegian poet, translator, and magazine editor

Norwegian-language surnames